Mark Stone: MIA Hunter is a series of men's adventure novels created and outlined by Stephen Mertz and co-written with Joe R. Lansdale, Michael Newton, and Bill Crider under the pseudonym "Jack Buchanan".

Series listing
1 - M.I.A. Hunter
2 - Cambodian Hellhole
3 - Hanoi Deathgrip (written by Joe R. Lansdale)
4 - Mountain Massacre (written by Joe R. Lansdale)
5 - Exodus from Hell
6 - Blood Storm
7 - Saigon Slaughter (written by Joe R. Lansdale)
8 - Escape from Nicaragua
9 - Invasion U.S.S.R.
10 - Miami War Zone (written by Bill Crider)
11 - Crossfire Kill
12 - Desert Death Raid (written by Bill Crider)
13 - L.A. Gang War
14 - Back to 'Nam (written by Bill Crider)
15 - Heavy Fire
16 - China Strike

References

American adventure novels
Novel series
Works published under a pseudonym
Works by Joe R. Lansdale